The 2021 Supercopa Paraguay was the first edition of the Supercopa Paraguay, Paraguay's football super cup. It was held on 12 December 2021 between the 2021 Primera División best-ranked champions in the aggregate table Cerro Porteño and the 2021 Copa Paraguay champions Olimpia, as the match that closed the 2021 season of Paraguayan football.

Olimpia were the winners, defeating Cerro Porteño by a 3–1 score.

Teams
The Supercopa Paraguay is contested by two teams: the champions of the Copa Paraguay and the Primera División (Apertura or Clausura) champions with the best record in the aggregate table of the season.

Details

References

External links
 Supercopa Paraguay on the Paraguayan Football Association's website

Supercopa Paraguay 2021
S